Distichlis distichophylla is a species of grass commonly known as Australian salt-grass, emu grass or pineapple grass.  It is a dioecious perennial plant that grows to about 30 cm in height, with creeping rhizomes up to 1 m long.  It is coarse and prickly, growing in damp, saline areas such as the fringes of saltmarshes.  It often forms mats where water is abundant.  Its appearance in places from which it had been absent can be an indication of rising soil salinity.

References

Chloridoideae
Flora of Victoria (Australia)
Flora of New South Wales
Flora of Tasmania
Flora of South Australia
Flora of Western Australia
Halophytes
Salt marsh plants
Taxa named by Jacques Labillardière
Plants described in 1805